is a species of milkvetch in the family Fabaceae.

References

jessenii
Taxa named by Alexander von Bunge